Baincthun is a commune in the Pas-de-Calais department in the Hauts-de-France region of France.

Geography

Population

Sights
 A feudal motte.
 The church of St. Martin.
 The Château d'Ordre, dating from 1672 at the hamlet of Maquinghen.
 The manor at Lannoy.

See also
Communes of the Pas-de-Calais department

References

Communes of Pas-de-Calais